Merman is a 1996 album by Emilíana Torrini. It includes covers of Tom Waits' "I Hope That I Don't Fall in Love With You" and The Velvet Underground's "Stephanie Says". It was the highest selling album in Iceland in 1996. It was co-produced and co-written by Jón Ólafsson. The song "The Boy Who Giggled So Sweet" was nominated as the song of the year at the Icelandic Music Awards.

Track listing
All songs written by Emilíana Torrini and Jón Ólafsson unless otherwise noted.
 "Blame It on the Sun" (Stevie Wonder)
 "The Boy Who Giggled So Sweet"
 "Stephanie Says" (Lou Reed)
 "Red Woman Red"
 "Old Man and Miss Beautiful" 
 "Chelsea Morning" (Joni Mitchell)
 "I Hope That I Don't Fall in Love With You" (Tom Waits)
 "Première Lovin'"
 "Merman"
 "I Really Loved Harold" (Melanie Safka)

References

Emilíana Torrini albums
1996 albums